American singer Willow Smith has released five solo studio albums, one collaborative studio album, four extended plays, 19 singles (including four as a featured artist), two promotional singles and ten music videos. In 2010, Smith released her debut single "Whip My Hair", which peaked at number 11 on the US Billboard Hot 100 and at number two on the UK Singles Chart. The song was certified platinum in the US, gold in Canada and silver in the United Kingdom. After follow-up singles "21st Century Girl" and "Fireball" failed to reach the same level of success as "Whip My Hair", Smith took a hiatus from music.

On December 11, 2015, Willow released her debut studio album, Ardipithecus, through Roc Nation; it peaked on the Heatseekers Albums chart at number 15. The album saw her depart from her earlier pop-oriented sound towards experimental neo soul and alternative R&B. She followed it up with the folk-influenced The 1st (2017), and the psychedelic-inspired Willow (2019). In 2020 she released the collaborative album The Anxiety with Tyler Cole.

Willow experienced a commercial and critical resurgence in 2021 following her fourth studio album Lately I Feel Everything, which saw her delve into a heavier punk rock and emo sound, received critical acclaim, and debuted at number 45 on the Billboard 200, her first entry on the chart. It spawned the single "Transparent Soul", which peaked at number 76 on the Hot 100, becoming her first charting song in a decade. The same year, "Meet Me at Our Spot", an album track from The Anxiety went viral on TikTok. Upon being released as a single the song peaked at number 21, her first top 40 hit since "Whip My Hair".

Studio albums

Collaborative albums

Extended plays (EPs)

Singles

As lead artist

As featured artist

Promotional singles

Other charted songs

Guest appearances

Music videos

Notes

References

Discographies of American artists
Pop music discographies